Partners for Fish and Wildlife is a voluntary partnership program administered by the Fish and Wildlife Service to provide financial and technical assistance to private landowners who wish to protect or restore wetlands, uplands, and riparian and instream habitats. This program has been widely used by rural landowners, including farmers.

References

External links

On the Fish & Wildlife Service webpage.

United States Department of Agriculture
Wetland conservation in the United States